Omocestus is a genus of 'short-horned grasshoppers' belonging to the family Acrididae subfamily Gomphocerinae.

Species
Species within this genus include:

 Omocestus (Dreuxius) Defaut, 1988
 Omocestus alluaudi Uvarov, 1927
 Omocestus antigai (Bolívar, 1897)
 Omocestus bolivari Chopard, 1939
 Omocestus femoralis Bolívar, 1908
 Omocestus lecerfi Chopard, 1937
 Omocestus lepineyi Chopard, 1937
 Omocestus minutissimus (Brullé, 1832)
 Omocestus navasi Bolívar, 1908
 Omocestus navasi bellmani 
 Omocestus uhagonii (Bolívar, 1876-1878)
 Omocestus (Haplomocestus) Tarbinsky, 1930
 Omocestus caucasicus Tarbinsky, 1930
 Unidentified subgenus
 Omocestus defauti Sardet & Braud, 2007
 Omocestus fontanai Massa, 2004
 Omocestus laojunshanensis Mao & Xu, 2004
 Omocestus maershanensis Mao & Xu, 2004
 Omocestus pinanensis Zheng & Xie, 2001
 Omocestus qinghaiuensis Zheng & Xie, 2001
 Omocestus xinjiangensis Liu, 1995
 Omocestus zhenglanensis Zheng & Han, 1998
 Omocestus (Omocestus) Bolívar, 1878
 Omocestus africanus Harz, 1970
 Omocestus aymonissabaudiae Salfi, 1934
 Omocestus cuonaensis Yin, 1984
 Omocestus demokidovi Ramme, 1930
 Omocestus enitor Uvarov, 1925
 Omocestus haemorrhoidalis (Charpentier, 1825)
 Omocestus harzi Nadig, 1988
 Omocestus heymonsi (Ramme, 1926)
 Omocestus hubeiensis Wang & Li, 1994
 Omocestus lopadusae La Greca, 1973
 Omocestus lucasii (Brisout de Barneville, 1850)
 Omocestus megaoculus Yin, 1984
 Omocestus minutus (Brullé, 1832)
 Omocestus motuoensis Yin, 1984
 Omocestus nadigi Harz, 1987
 Omocestus nanus Uvarov, 1934
 Omocestus nigripennus Zheng, 1993
 Omocestus nyalamus Hsia, 1981
 Omocestus panteli (Bolívar, 1887)
 Omocestus petraeus (Brisout de Barneville, 1855)
 Omocestus raymondi (Yersin, 1863)
 Omocestus rufipes (Zetterstedt, 1821)
 Omocestus simonyi (Krauss, 1892)
 Omocestus tibetanus Uvarov, 1939
 Omocestus tzendsureni Harz, 1970
 Omocestus uvarovi Zanon, 1926
 Omocestus viridulus (Linnaeus, 1758)
 Omocestus znojkoi Mishchenko, 1951

References